Hearts and Bones is a 2019 Australian drama film directed and co-written by Ben Lawrence. The film follows a war photographer and a refugee. It stars Hugo Weaving, Andrew Luri, Hayley McElhinney and Bolude Watson.

Cast
 Hugo Weaving - Dan Fisher
 Andrew Luri - Sebastian Ahmed
 Hayley McElhinney - Josie Avril
 Bolude Watson - Anishka Ahmed

Release
Hearts and Bones was shown at a number of film festivals in 2019, after which the film was originally slated for an April 2020 release into Australian cinemas. The April wide-release was cancelled due to the COVID-19 pandemic, which forced the shutdown of the nation's cinemas. Instead of delaying the theatrical release, the film opted instead to release directly onto digital platforms on May 6, 2020. 
The home-video release was planned for June 3, 2020.

Critical response
On review aggregator Rotten Tomatoes, Hearts and Bones has  approval rating, based on  reviews The site's critical consensus reads, "Hearts and Bones is more powerful in concept than execution, although strong work from a deftly assembled cast adds much-needed heft."

Variety's Eddie Cockrell called it "an impressive narrative feature debut". Harry Windsor from the Hollywood Reporter gave his bottom line as "A drama about good intentions that pulls up just short of the abyss." Sarah Ward from Screen Daily wrote "An intimate film tackling an expansive subject — the treatment of refugees around the globe, and the way the world processes the traumas that lead to such urgent, widespread immigration — this is a poignant and morally complex drama".

Accolades

Members of the cast received three nominations at the 9th AACTA Awards.
Hugo Weaving was nominated for Best Actor,
Andrew Luri for Best Supporting Actor,
and Bolude Watson for Best Supporting Actress.

References

External links
 

2019 films
2019 drama films
Australian drama films
Films not released in theaters due to the COVID-19 pandemic
2010s English-language films